Freziera is a Neotropical genus of trees (or rarely shrubs) in the family Pentaphylacaceae. It contains the following species (but this list may be incomplete):
 Freziera alata 
 Freziera angulosa 
 Freziera biserrata 
 Freziera caesariata 
 Freziera caloneura 
 Freziera campanulata 
 Freziera ciliata 
 Freziera cordata 
 Freziera dudleyi 
 Freziera echinata 
 Freziera euryoides 
 Freziera ferruginea 
 Freziera forerorum 
 Freziera friedrichsthailana 
 Freziera glabrescens 
 Freziera inaequilatera 
 Freziera incana 
 Freziera jaramilloi 
 Freziera longipes 
 Freziera minima 
 Freziera obovata 
 Freziera parva 
 Freziera punctata 
 Freziera retinveria 
 Freziera revoluta 
 Freziera roraimensis 
 Freziera rufescens 
 Freziera sessiliflora 
 Freziera smithiana 
 Freziera spathulifolia 
 Freziera stuebelii 
 Freziera suberosa 
 Freziera subintegrifolia 
 Freziera tomentosa 
 Freziera uncinata 
 Freziera undulata 
 Freziera uniauriculata 
 Freziera varibrateata 
 Freziera velutina

References

 
Ericales genera
Taxonomy articles created by Polbot